The sub-prefectures (known in French as sous-prefectures) are the third-level administrative divisions in Guinea. As of 2009 there were 303 rural sub-prefectures of Guinea and 38 urban sub-prefectures, 5 of which compose the Conakry greater urban area; Kaloum, Dixinn, Matam, Ratoma and Matoto.

Sub-prefectures of Guinea

Eastern Guinea

Region of Faranah
Dabola Prefecture
 Arfamoussaya
 Banko
 Bissikrima
 Dabola-Centre (urban)
 Dogomet
 Kankama
 Kindoyé
 Konendou
 N'Déma

Dinguiraye Prefecture
 Banora
 Dialakoro
 Diatifèrè
 Dinguiraye-Centre (urban)
 Gagnakaly
 Kalinko
 Lansanaya
 Sélouma

Faranah Prefecture
 Banian
 Beindou
 Faranah-Centre (urban)
 Gnaléah
 Hérémakonon
 Kobikoro
 Marela
 Passaya
 Sandéniyah
 Songoyah
 Tiro
 Tindo

Kissidougou Prefecture
 Albadariah
 Banama
 Bardou
 Beindou
 Fermessadou-Pombo
 Firawa-Yomadou
 Gbangbadou
 Kissidougou-Centre (urban)
 Koundiatou
 Manfran
 Sangardo
 Yendé-Millimou
 Yombiro

Region of Kankan
Kankan Prefecture
 Balandougou
 Baté-Nafadji
 Boula
 Gbérédou-Baranama
 Kanfamoriya
 Kankan-Centre (urban)
 Koumba
 Mamouroudou
 Misamana
 Moribaya
 Sabadou-Baranama
 Tinti-Oulen
 Tokounou

Kérouané Prefecture
 Banankoro
 Damaro
 Kérouané-Centre (urban)
 Komodou
 Kounsankoro
 Linko
 Sibiribaro
 Soromayah

Kouroussa Prefecture
 Babila
 Balato
 Banfèlè
 Baro
 Cisséla
 Douako
 Doura
 Kiniéro
 Koumana
 Komola-Koura
 Kouroussa-Centre (urban)
 Sanguiana

Mandiana Prefecture
 Balandougouba
 Dialakoro
 Faralako
 Kantoumania
 Kiniéran
 Koudianakoro
 Koundian
 Mandiana-Centre (urban)
 Morodou
 Niantanina
 Saladou
 Sansando

Siguiri Prefecture
 Bankon
 Doko
 Franwalia
 Kiniébakora
 Kintinian
 Maléah
 Naboun
 Niagassola
 Niandankoro
 Norassoba
 Siguiri-Centre (urban)
 Siguirini
 Nounkounkan
 Tomba kanssa

Region of Nzérékoré
Beyla Prefecture
 Beyla-Centre (urban)
 Boola
 Diara-Guéréla
 Diassodou
 Fouala
 Gbackédou
 Gbéssoba
 Karala
 Koumandou
 Mousadou
 Nionsomoridou
 Samana
 Sinko
 Sokourala

Guéckédou Prefecture
 Bolodou
 Fangamadou
 Guéckédou-Centre (urban)
 Guéndembou
 Kassadou
 Koundou
 Nongoa
 Ouéndé-Kénéma
 Tékoulo
 Termessadou-Djibo

Lola Prefecture
 Bossou
 Foumbadou
 Gama
 Guéassou
 Kokota
 Laine
 Lola-Centre (urban)
 N'Zoo
 Tounkarata

Macenta Prefecture
 Balizia
 Binikala
 Bofossou
 Daro
 Fassankoni
 Kouankan
 Koyama
 Macenta-Centre (urban)
 N'Zébéla
 Ourémaï
 Panziazou
 Sengbédou
 Sérédou
 Vasérédou
 Watanka

Nzérékoré Prefecture
 Bounouma
 Gouécké
 Kobéla
 Koropara
 Koulé
 N'Zérékoré-Centre (urban)
 Palé
 Samoé
 Soulouta
 Womey
 Yalenzou

Yomou Prefecture
 Banié
 Bheeta
 Bignamou
 Bowé
 Diécké
 Péla
 Yomou-Centre (urban)

Western Guinea

Region of Boké
Boffa Prefecture
 Boffa-Centre (urban)
 Colia
 Douprou
 Koba-Tatema
 Lisso
 Mankountan
 Tamita
 Tougnifily

Boké Prefecture
 Bintimodia
 Boké-Centre (urban)
 Dabiss
 Kamsar (urban)
 Kanfarandé
 Kolaboui
 Malapouyah
 Sangarédi (urban)
 Sansalé
 Tanènè

Fria Prefecture
 Banguinet
 Banguingny
 Fria-Centre (urban)
 Tormelin

Gaoual Prefecture
 Foulamory
 Gaoual-Centre (urban)
 Kakony
 Koumbia
 Kounsitel
 Malanta
 Touba
 Wendou M'Bour

Koundara Prefecture
 Guingan
 Kamaby
 Koundara-Centre (urban)
 Sambaïlo
 Saréboïdo
 Termessé
 Youkounkoun

Region of Kindia
Coyah Prefecture
 Coyah-Centre (urban)
 Kouriah
 Manéah
 Wonkifong

Dubréka Prefecture
 Badi
 Dubréka-Centre (urban)
 Faléssadé
 Khorira
 Ouassou
 Tanènè
 Tondon

Forécariah Prefecture
 Alassoyah
 Benty
 Farmoriyah
 Forécariah-Centre (urban)
 Kaback
 Kakossa
 Kallia
 Maférinyah
 Moussayah
 Sikhourou

Kindia Prefecture
 Bangouya
 Damankaniah
 Friguiagbé
 Kindia-Centre (urban)
 Kolenté
 Madina-Oula
 Mambia
 Molota
 Samaya
 Souguéta

Télimélé Prefecture
 Bourouwal
 Daramagnaki
 Gougoudjé
 Koba
 Kollet
 Konsotami
 Missira
 Santou
 Sarékali
 Sinta
 Sogolon
 Tarihoye
 Télimélé-Centre (urban)
 Thionthian

Region of Labé
Koubia Prefecture
 Fafaya
 Gadha-Woundou
 Koubia-Centre (urban)
 Matakaou
 Missira
 Pilimini

Labé Prefecture
 Dalein
 Daralabe
 Diari
 Dionfo
 Garambé
 Hafia
 Kaalan
 Kouramandji
 Labé-Centre (urban)
 Noussy
 Popodara
 Sannoun
 Tountouroun

Lélouma Prefecture
 Balaya
 Diountou
 Hérico
 Korbè
 Lafou
 Lélouma-Centre (urban)
 Linsan
 Manda
 Parawol
 Sagalé
 Tyanguel-Bori

Mali Prefecture
 Balaki
 Donghol-Sigon
 Dougountouny
 Fougou
 Gayah
 Hidayatou
 Lébékére
 Madina-Wora
 Mali-Centre (urban)
 Madina-Salambandé
 Téliré
 Touba
 Yimbéring

Tougué Prefecture
 Fatako
 Fello-Koundoua
 Kansangui
 Kolangui
 Kollet
 Konah
 Kouratongo
 Koyïn
 Tangali
 Tougué-Centre (urban)

Region of Mamou
Dalaba Prefecture
 Bodié
 Dalaba-Centre (urban)
 Ditinn
 Kaala
 Kankalabé
 Kébali
 Koba
 Mafara
 Mitty
 Mombéyah

Mamou Prefecture
 Bouliwel
 Dounet
 Gongorèt
 Kégnéko
 Konkouré
 Mamou-Centre (urban)
 Nyagara
 Ouré-Kaba
 Porédaka
 Saramoussayah
 Soyah
 Téguéréya
 Timbo
 Tolo

Pita Prefecture
 Bantignel
 Bourouwal-Tappé
 Dongol-Touma
 Gongorè
 Ley-Miro
 Maci
 Ninguélandé
 Pita-Centre (urban)
 Sangaréyah
 Sintali
 Timbi-Madina
 Timbi-Touny

Special Zone of Conakry
Conakry
 Dixinn (urban)
 Kaloum (urban)
 Matam (urban)
 Matoto (urban)
 Ratoma (urban)

See also 
 Administrative divisions of Guinea

References

External links
Official government site

 
Subdivisions of Guinea
Guinea, Subprefectures
Guinea 3
Subprefectures, Guinea
Guinea geography-related lists